The United States men's national under-21 volleyball team represents the United States in international men's volleyball competitions and friendly matches under the age 21 and it is ruled by the USA Volleyball USAV body That is an affiliate of the International Volleyball Federation FIVB and also a part of the North, Central America and Caribbean Volleyball Confederation NORCECA.

Results

FIVB U21 World Championship
 Champions   Runners up   Third place   Fourth place

NORCECA U21 Championship
 Champions   Runners up   Third place   Fourth place

Junior Pan-American Cup
 2022 Cuba ––  Gold medal

Team

Current squad
The following is the American roster in the 2017 FIVB Volleyball Men's U21 World Championship.

Head coach: Jay Hosack

Notable players

References

External links
 www.usavolleyball.org

National men's under-21 volleyball teams
Volleyball in the United States
Volleyball